Werauhia insignis is an epiphyte in the montane cloud forests of Central America distributed through native Costa Rica and Panama.

References 

insignis
Flora of Central America
Epiphytes